The Irish Hospitality Institute (IHI) was founded in 1966 as the Irish Hotel and Catering Institute (IHCI), as a not-for-profit professional body for managers in the hotel, tourism, and catering industries in Ireland, collectively known as the hospitality industry.
The IHI promotes professionalism in the hospitality industry by running seminars and education courses for its members; it also promotes courses in educational institutions in Ireland by means of its Graduate of the Year Award and student membership.

Due to the international nature of the workforce, the IHI is also involved in various diversity initiatives.

Awards
The IHI hosts an annual gala dinner where it awards prizes to figures in the hospitality industry for their achievements that year.
 Graduate of the Year Award
 Young Manager of the Year Award
 Human Resources Manager of the Year Award
 Catering Manager of the Year Award
 Hotel Manager of the Year Award

Footnotes

1966 establishments in Ireland
Professional associations based in Ireland
Organizations established in 1966
Hospitality companies of Ireland
Seanad nominating bodies